The following is a list of Long Beach State Beach men's basketball head coaches. There have been 16 head coaches of the Beach in their 73-season history.

Long Beach State's current head coach is Dan Monson. He was hired as the Beach's head coach in April 2008, replacing Larry Reynolds, who was fired after the 2006–07 season.

References

Long Beach State

Long Beach State Beach basketball, men's, coaches